Clara van Wel (born 5 August 1997) is a New Zealand singer-songwriter, best known for winning series two of New Zealand's Got Talent in 2012.

Background 

Van Wel was born in England and moved to New Zealand aged seven. She started writing her own songs after receiving a guitar when she was 10 and regularly performed at the Marlborough Farmers' Market. Van Wel enjoyed success in local Marlborough talent shows. In 2010, aged 12, van Wel won Marlborough Got Talent with her self-penned song "Crocodile Tears", and in 2011, van Wel won Marlborough Stars in Your Eyes, where she performed as Rickie Lee Jones.

In both 2011 and 2012, van Wel won the Marlborough regional final of the Smokefreerockquest school music competition. In 2011, aged 13, she performed her original songs "Closer" and "Living a Life", and in 2012 she performed her songs "For A Moment" and "What Else Is There?" Despite her regional wins, van Wel was not selected for either the 2011 or 2012 national finals.

New Zealand's Got Talent 

In 2012, Van Wel won the second series of New Zealand's Got Talent, performing original songs, including her grand final song "Where Do You Find Love?" Van Wel first appeared in the fourth semi-final, screened on 4 November, where she played original composition "Between The Lines". She won the audience vote, earning her a place in the grand final. For the final on 25 November, she performed another original composition, "Where Do You Find Love?". In the results show, van Wel was first announced as one of the top three voted contestants, before being announced as the winner of the series. She won a $100,000 cash prize and a 2013 Toyota Corolla car.

Music career 

Following her New Zealand's Got Talent win, van Wel was signed to Sony Music New Zealand. A single of "Where Do You Find Love?" was released digitally on 7 December 2012, along with van Wel's two other original songs from New Zealand's Got Talent - "Between The Lines" and "Lines You Traced". The CD single was released on 12 December and debuted at number three in the New Zealand pop charts. The other two songs on the single - "Between the Lines" and "Lines You Traced" charted at 35 and 36 respectively.

In January 2013, van Wel began recording songs for her debut album, and in March she released second single "Beautiful".  She was also added to the line-up of the Classic Hits Winery Tour, touring New Zealand in February and March along with Fat Freddy's Drop and The Adults. In September she released third single "Wait For Me" on iTunes, co-written with Don McGlashan, with whom she also worked on other new recordings. Her debut, self-titled album was released on 25 October 2013. It is co-produced by Don McGlashan and Joel Little.

In August 2014, van Wel featured with other New Zealand artists on the charity single "Song for Everyone".

Discography

Albums

Singles

Other charted songs

References

External links 
 Official Facebook page
 

People from Blenheim, New Zealand
Got Talent winners
New Zealand women singer-songwriters
1997 births
Living people
British emigrants to New Zealand
21st-century New Zealand women singers
Sony Music New Zealand artists